The 2003 Qatar Open, known as the 2003 Qatar ExxonMobil Open, for sponsorship reasons, was a men's tennis tournament played on outdoor hard courts at the Khalifa International Tennis Complex in Doha in Qatar and was part of the International Series of the 2003 ATP Tour. The tournament ran from 30 December 2002 through 5 January 2003. Unseeded Stefan Koubek won the singles title.

Finals

Singles

 Stefan Koubek defeated  Jan-Michael Gambill 6–4, 6–4

Doubles

 Martin Damm /  Cyril Suk defeated  Mark Knowles /  Daniel Nestor 6–4, 7–6, [10–8]

References

External links
 Official website
 ATP tournament profile